This is a list of 244 species in the genus Cheumatopsyche.

Cheumatopsyche species

References